Magnus Saugstrup Jensen (born 12 July 1996) is a Danish handball player for SC Magdeburg and the Danish national team.

References

External links

1996 births
Living people
Danish male handball players
Sportspeople from Aalborg
Aalborg Håndbold players
Handball players at the 2020 Summer Olympics
Medalists at the 2020 Summer Olympics
Olympic silver medalists for Denmark
Olympic medalists in handball
SC Magdeburg players